There are at least 67 named lakes and reservoirs in Lewis and Clark County, Montana.

Lakes
 Alpine Lake, el. 
 Beale Lake, el. 
 Bean Lake, el. 
 Bear Lake, el. 
 Beaver Ponds, el. 
 Beaver Ponds, el. 
 Bighorn Lake, el. 
 Camp Lake, el. 
 Canyon Lake, el. 
 Connors Lake, el. 
 Copper Lake, el. 
 Flesher Lakes, el. 
 Gates Lake, el. 
 Grassy Lake, el. 
 Gravelly Range Lake, el. 
 Hazard Lake, el. 
 Heart Lake, el. 
 Hermit Lake, el. 
 Herrin Lakes, el. 
 Hidden Lake, el. 
 Keep Cool Lakes, el. 
 Krohn Lake, el. 
 Krone Lake, el. 
 Lake Levale, el. 
 Lake Quiet, el. 
 Meadow Lake, el. 
 Meyer Lake, el. 
 My Lake, el. 
 Parker Lake, el. 
 Red Lake, el. 
 Renshaw Lake, el. 
 Silver King Lake, el. 
 Smith Lake, el. 
 Smith Lake, el. 
 Snowbank Lake, el. 
 Sock Lake, el. 
 Sun Lake, el. 
 Twin Lakes, el. 
 Twin Lakes, el. 
 Two Point Lake, el. 
 Unnamed Lake, el. 
 Upper Copper Lake, el. 
 Upper Holter Lake, el. 
 Webb Lake, el. 
 Wood Lake, el.

Reservoirs

 Anderson Lake, el. 
 Canyon Ferry Lake, el. 
 Chessman Reservoir, el. 
 Chessman Reservoir, el. 
 Diversion Lake, el. 
 Dry Creek-Krezelok Reservoir, el. 
 Gibson Reservoir, el. 
 Gravelly Range Lake, el. 
 Hauser Lake, el. 
 Helena Valley Regulating Reservoir, el. 
 Helena Valley Reservoir, el. 
 Holter Lake, el. 
 Lake Helena, el. 
 Mike Horse, el. 
 Nilan Reservoir, el. 
 Scott Reservoir, el. 
 Scott Reservoir, el. 
 Soap Creek Reservoir, el. 
 Stansfield Lake, el. 
 Travis Reservoir, el. 
 Willow Creek Reservoir, el. 
 Wood Lake, el.

See also
 List of lakes in Montana

Notes

Bodies of water of Lewis and Clark County, Montana
Lewis and